Coleophora toxotis is a moth of the family Coleophoridae. It is found in Mongolia.

References

toxotis
Moths of Asia
Moths described in 1975